Svenska Spårvägssällskapet (The Swedish Tramway Society) (SSS) is a nonprofit organization for people who are interested in public transport. The association was founded in 1959 under the name of Stockholms Spårvägssällskap (Stockholm Tramway Society), but the name was later changed to Svenska Spårvägssällskapet after members from even the rest of Sweden to come. The association consists of a national Association and organized seven separate chapters: Gävle, Gothenburg, Malmö, Stockholm, Sundsvall, Sörmland, Uppsala and Östergötland.

The association publishes six issues per year of its member magazine MFSS (Meddelanden Från Svenska Spårvägssällskapet) and the independent trade magazine Modern stadstrafik.

The association operates the Swedish Urban Transport Museum in Malmköping and in Stockholm they own AB Stockholm Spårvägar (SS), a company that operates several tramways in the Stockholm area including the heritage streetcar Djurgårdslinjen. The association also runs a heritage streetcar in Malmö.

Spårvägsällskapets site claims to be the largest web portal for local fans.

External links
Official website

References

Notes

Non-profit organizations based in Sweden
Public transport in Sweden